Side B is the third and final EP by American singer and songwriter  Christina Grimmie. It was released posthumously on April 21, 2017 through Republic Records and Universal Music Group.

Grimmie's family had scheduled to release her first single "Invisible" on February 14, 2017. The release was pushed back to February 17, 2017, when Christina's family announced they signed with Republic Records to release her music. On the day of the release of "Invisible", Grimmie's family and producer confirmed that they will be releasing the third EP, Side B, as Christina also confirmed herself before her death on June 10, 2016.
At some point, this EP as well as her second album All Is Vanity were made unavailable on streaming platforms for unknown reasons.

Singles
"Invisible" serves as the EP's lead single, released on February 17, 2017. Upon its release, it debuted at number 25 on the Billboard Twitter Top Tracks  chart in the US. The music video was released on March 10, 2017.

Track listing

Notes
"I Won't Give Up" is a cover song, originally written, released & performed by Jason Mraz in 2012. Grimmie previously covered the song on her YouTube channel and then performed it on The Voice.

Release history

References

2017 EPs
Electropop EPs
Christina Grimmie albums
Republic Records EPs
EPs published posthumously